Monkey Bone is a recording company in Malaysia.

Monkey Bone may also refer to:

 Monkeybone, a 2001 film starring Brendan Fraser and directed by Henry Selick